The second edition of the Men's Hockey Tournament at the Commonwealth Games took place during the 2002 Commonwealth Games at the Belle Vue Hockey Centre in Manchester, England. The event started on Saturday July 27 and ended on Sunday August 4, 2002.

Participating nations

Results

Preliminary round

Pool A

Pool B

Classification round

Seventh and eighth place

First to sixth place classification

Quarter-finals

Fifth and sixth place

Semi-finals

Third and fourth place

Final

Statistics

Final standings

Goalscorers

Awards

References
Fieldhockey Canada
BBC SPORT - Commonwealth Games 2002 - Hockey

Men's tournament